Suspension of Disbelief is a 2012 English thriller film written, directed, edited, co-produced by Mike Figgis and starring Sebastian Koch, Lotte Verbeek, Emilia Fox, Rebecca Night, Eoin Macken, Lachlan Nieboer, Frances de la Tour, Julian Sands and Kenneth Cranham. It was premiered at the 7th Rome Film Festival in November 2012. It played in the 12th East End Film Festival on 6 July 2013 and in Rio de Janeiro International Film Festival on 26 September 2013. The film was released in the UK on 19 July 2013.

Plot
Martin is a successful writer whose wife suddenly disappeared. During a film shoot, 15 years later, Martin meets Angelique, who disappears the same night. The next day police find her body and a mysterious investigation begins.

Cast
 Sebastian Koch as Martin
 Lotte Verbeek as Therese / Angelique 
 Emilia Fox as Claire Jones 
 Rebecca Night as Sarah
 Eoin Macken as Greg
 Lachlan Nieboer as Dominic
 Frances de la Tour as Nesta
 Julian Sands as DCI Hackett
 Kenneth Cranham as Bullock

Reception
The film received generally negative reviews. Review aggregator Rotten Tomatoes reports that 13% of eight professional critics have given the film a positive review, and it has a rating average of 4.2 out of 10.  Jay Weissberg of Variety wrote that the film does not give viewers a reason to suspend disbelief.  Deborah Young of The Hollywood Reporter described it as "a take-off on film noir doubles as a love story and an enjoyable tease about the filmmaking process".

Awards
Suspension of Disbelief was nominated for CinemaXXI Award in Rome Film Festival 2012.

References

External links
 
 

2012 films
2012 thriller films
British thriller films
English films
Films directed by Mike Figgis
Films shot in London
2010s English-language films
2010s British films